Kalabushana Gajanayake Arachchige Somi Kalani Chandrika Siriwardena (: born 11 November 1948), popularly as Chandrika Siriwardena, is a Sri Lankan songstress and playback singer. A pioneer artist in reality musical programs in Sri Lanka, she recorded the songs Midule Mal Sooriya Gaha Mudune, Igillila Yanna Yan and Ranabima Marune in a career that spanned more than six decades.

Personal life
She was born on 11 November 1948 in Kandy as the third in a family with three siblings. Her father, Peter Siriwardena was an accomplished musician and an actor. He worked as a lecturer in music at the Government Women's Training College, Polgolla. Her mother Srimathi Karuna Devi was a music teacher as well as an actress. She first attended to Primary section of teacher training college and then she completed secondary education at Pushpadana Girls' College, Kandy. Chandrika has two elder brothers.

His brother Sunil Siriwardena is a singer, lyricist and broadcaster. He has two sons - Madhumadhawa Aravinda and Dhananjaya Siriwardena. Madhumadhawa is also a famous singer who sang the songs, Lamba Sawan, Kovula Amathanu, Sihinayak Sihiwee and Sith Sith Sith. Dhananjaya is a popular actor in cinema, theater and television. He is married to Shashini, a flight attendant.

She was married to Anton Alwis, who was a journalist as well as a lyricist. The couple has one son, Prashantha Udaya and one daughter, Jithendrika. Jithendrika Jayakalani is a Bharatha dancer. Her husband Anton died on 26 March 2017 at the age of 64. Chandrika's granddaughter Dulshara Dasanthi is also a singer.

Career
At the age of five, Chandrika joined Lama Pitiya children's program in Radio Ceylon. She excelled as a Sinhala singer of excellent grade, and a Tamil singer of excellent grade and a classical Singer during her career at Radio Ceylon. Her elder brother Sunil Siriwardena was famous on the radio as a simple singer. One day he took Chandrika to the duet of the Thalamala Waruna song that he was supposed to sing. She then sang a simple song Raththaranin Ran Mala Nobendata for a simple song program at Radio Ceylon. At the age of 18, she went to G. S. B. Rani's 'Tharangani' program without an audition where she sang her first popular song Ukdandu Ginnen Upannemi written by Saman Chandranath Weerasinghe and music by Sarath Dassanayake.

After completing education, she went India and obtained a master's degree from Bhatkhande University with a First Grade Pass. She excels in North Indian classical music as well as South Indian Carnatic music during that period. After returning to Sri Lanka, she sang the song Viyo Wee Mihimadala for the television serial Sura Asura.

Chandrika has rendered her voice as well as acted in many films including, Thilaka Saha Thilaka, Giju Lihiniyo, Raththaran Amma, Devduwa and Jeewana Kandulu. She won Sarasaviya Award for the song Nim Walalla in the film Hithawathiya. She has sung several songs under semi-classical music. Her song Ranabima Marune Sinhalayeknam became an extremely popular song in Sri Lanka. Chandrika won awards for the films Sinasenna Raththaran in the 80's, the film Hithawathiya and the film Chaya. In the film Chaya she contributed as a choreographer for Sabeetha Perera.

In 2006, Chandrika joined Sirasa TV for the first season of music reality show Sirasa Superstar. She was a judge for the first few rounds in first season. However, in 2007 she continued to be one of the main judge in season 2. Later in 2012, she joined Derana Dreamstar as a judge.

In 2012, Chandrika was honored at 36th SIGNIS OCIC Salutation Festival. In 2016, she was awarded Kalabushana by the president Maithripala Sirisena.

To celebrate her 70th birthday, she performed a solo concert "Ran Tharakavo" on 11 November 2018 at 6.30 pm at the Bandaranaike International Conference Hall. In 2021, she made her acting debut with the television serial Divithura.

Filmography

References

External links
 ‘‘රන් තාරකාවෝ’’ මගේ උපන් දිනය වෙනුවෙන් රසිකයන්ට දෙන තෑග්ගක් - චන්ද්‍රිකා සිරිවර්ධන
 රන් තාරකාවෝ දිලිසුණ දා
 Chandrika Siriwardana songs
 Sanda Madale Sita
 Gee Ran Gee

Living people
20th-century Sri Lankan women singers
Sinhalese singers
1948 births